"A Gal in Calico" is a song by American composer Arthur Schwartz, whose words were written by Leo Robin.

Appearance in film
The song was introduced in the 1946 film The Time, the Place and the Girl. In the film, it was performed by Dennis Morgan, Jack Carson, Martha Vickers (dubbed by Sally Sweetland) and chorus.
It was nominated for Academy Award for Best Original Song of 1948 but lost out to "Zip-a-Dee-Doo-Dah".

Chart appearances
Four versions have entered the US Billboard charts: Johnny Mercer (reached No. 5 in 1946); Tex Beneke (No. 6 in 1947); Benny Goodman (No. 6 in 1947) and Bing Crosby (recorded May 7, 1946,  No. 8 in 1947).

Other recordings
The song has also been recorded by: 
Steve Lawrence (in his 1963 Swinging West album), 
Tony Martin, 
Vic Damone 
Ahmad Jamal and Miles Davis. 
In the 1970s, it appeared on the album Pastiche by The Manhattan Transfer.

Popular culture
The song is whistled briefly by Lon McCallister early in the film The Story of Seabiscuit (1949).

References

1946 songs
Songs with music by Arthur Schwartz
Songs with lyrics by Leo Robin
Songs written for films
1940s jazz standards